De-Pierre Map is an ancient map of the city of Jerusalem which was drawn by and signed in Latin : De Pierre  Eques SSmi Sepulchri in 1728 . De Pierre a French  pilgrim an Equestrian Knight of the Holy Sepulchre.

Today the map is found within the Eran Laor maps collection in the National Library of Israel in Jerusalem.

Description
The map provides a detailed description of the old city of Jerusalem, with an accurate description of the ancient city's wall which was built by Suleiman the Magnificent, of the Temple Mount structures, and of the Tower of David. The structures surrounding the ancient city and the locations of the ancient city's streets are illustrated freely. The perspective onto the city is the view from the Mount of Olives (namely from east to west). At the bottom of the map appears an illustration of the Jordan River, and on the map's left side an illustration of the Dead Sea area.

The map also exhibits historical and biblical events, such as Avshalom the son of Israeli king David hanging from a tree, two of The Twelve Spies holding a cluster of grapes, the battle of David and Goliath, Abraham's three visitors, and the Star of Bethlehem.

The map was dedicated to empress Elisabeth Christine, the wife of Charles VI, Holy Roman Emperor.

The dimension of the map is 84.3 by 53.4 centimeters.

References
Jerusalem in Maps and Mirrors, from Byzantine Period Until the 19th Century, 1987, Nahar Books and Kinneret Zmora-Bitan Dvir publishers, The National Library of Israel, Jerusalem.

External links
 Information about the map at Eran Laor's Collection, The National Library of Israel website.

Old maps of Jerusalem
18th-century maps and globes